Appleby railway station is a former railway station in Appleby, Lincolnshire, England.

History
The station was opened by the Trent, Ancholme and Grimsby Railway on its 14 mile long line from Gunness, on the east bank of the Trent where it made an end-on junction with the South Yorkshire Railway's line from Doncaster, and Wrawby Junction, near Barnetby, where it met the main line of the Manchester, Sheffield and Lincolnshire Railway from Retford to Grimsby. The station was, like others on the line, staggered over a level crossing. The line was absorbed by the M. S. & L. R., later becoming the Great Central Railway, becoming part of the London and North Eastern Railway during the Grouping of 1923. The station then passed on to the Eastern Region of British Railways on nationalisation in 1948.

It was then closed by the British Railways Board in June 1967.

The site today
Trains using the South TransPennine line still pass the site of the station.

References

External links
 Station on navigable O.S. map.

Disused railway stations in the Borough of North Lincolnshire
Railway stations in Great Britain opened in 1866
Railway stations in Great Britain closed in 1967
Former Great Central Railway stations